Lybohora is a village (selo) in Stryi Raion, Lviv Oblast (province)  of  Western Ukraine. It belongs to Slavske settlement hromada, one of the hromadas of Ukraine. The village has under 1,000 inhabitants and its area is 1,46 km2.

Local government is administered by Lybokhorivska village council.

Geography 
The village is located between high mountains. The second highest peak of Lviv region - Mount Magura towers over the village.

History and attractions 
The village was founded probably around 1300, but began to be mentioned in written sources in the 14th and 15th centuries.

Until 18 July 2020, Lybohora belonged to Skole Raion. The raion was abolished in July 2020 as part of the administrative reform of Ukraine, which reduced the number of raions of Lviv Oblast to seven. The area of Skole Raion was merged into Stryi Raion.

The village has an architectural monument of local importance of Stryi Raion – Christmas Church (wood.) 1790 (1496-M).

References

Further reading

External links 
 Lybohora (Lviv region)
 weather.in.ua

Villages in Stryi Raion